Milioner (Cyrillic: Милионер) in South Slavic languages meaning 'Millionaire' could refer to:

In music:

Milioner (album) - an album by Macedonian singer Elena Risteska
"Milioner (song)" - a 2006/2008 single by Elena Risteska